Betssy Betzabet Chávez Chino (born 3 June 1989) is a Peruvian lawyer and politician, who served as prime minister of Peru from 26 November until 7 December 2022 when she resigned from office. She was Peru's seventh female prime minister. She has been a member of the Peruvian Congress since July 2021 and served as Minister of Culture from August 2022 to November 2022. She previously was Minister of Labor and Employment Promotion, from October 2021 until  May 2022, when a censure motion against her was approved. She later held the position of Minister of Culture, before being appointed prime minister.

Chávez is the fifth Prime Minister to be appointed by President Pedro Castillo, which is seen by observers as a result of ongoing political instability. She announced her resignation on 7 December.

Early life and pre-political career 
Chávez was born on June 3, 1989, in Ciudad Nueva District, Tacna, Peru.

Education 
Studying law at Jorge Basadre Grohmann National University, Chávez was a student leader, holding positions in the student government. Graduating as a lawyer in 2016, Chávez has a postgraduate master's degree, with a focus on Constitutional Law, from José Carlos Mariátegui University.

Career 
Chávez worked as a lawyer in the Regional Government of Tacna (2020), a technician and assistant in the Congress of the Republic (2017–2020) and head of practices at the Jorge Basadre Grohmann University School of Law.

Political career 
Chávez indicates that her interest in politics arose from her father's work as a social leader for families that settled in the northern cone of Tacna.

In 2013, she was a candidate for the regional council of Tacna, for Alliance for Progress but she was not elected.

Congresswoman 
She was elected congresswoman in the 2021 parliamentary elections with 8,472 votes; she on behalf of Tacna, for the Free Peru party. She was inaugurated on July 27 of the same year. She is also part of the Democratic Peru parliamentary group.

Ministries

Work and Employment Promotion 
On October 6, 2021, she was appointed and sworn in by President Pedro Castillo, as Minister of Labor and Employment Promotion of Peru.

In April 2022, various media outlets denounced that the minister had authorized a strike by air traffic controllers, which caused the cancellation of internal and international flights on the occasion of Holy Week. After that, she was questioned by the Congress of the Republic of Peru on May 13. On the 19th of the same month, in Congress, various congressmen presented a motion of censure against Minister Chávez. The following 26, Congress approved the censorship with 71 votes in favor due to her inability to manage and negligence in her performance.

Culture 
On August 5 of the same year, she was appointed and inaugurated by President Castillo, as Minister of Culture of Peru. In statements to the press, the new minister mentioned that having been censured as Minister of Labor does not prevent her from assuming the portfolio of Culture. Minister Diana Miloslavich said at the time: "Her censorship does not mean that she does not do an excellent job", and Minister Alejandro Salas stated: "She is a great professional... and, if at any moment (the president) considers that she should be premier". She held that position until the following November 25, being replaced by Silvia Robles Araujo.

President of the Council of Ministers 
November 25, 2022, she was appointed and sworn in by President Pedro Castillo as President of the Council of Ministers of Peru; after the acceptance of the resignation of Prime Minister Aníbal Torres.

Controversies 
Chávez, then Minister of Culture, through her TikTok account, described the Peruvian Attorney General Patricia Benavides as a "coup plotter" and referred to her as "Blanca Nélida Colán 2.0", a reference to a prosecutor aligned with Fujimorism who failed to prosecute Vladimiro Montesinos. This compounded problems after the initiation of a preliminary investigation against her, related to the favoring of her relatives in public office.

References

1989 births
Living people
People from Tacna Region
Prime Ministers of Peru
Culture ministers of Peru
Free Peru politicians
Independent politicians in Peru
Women prime ministers
Women government ministers of Peru
20th-century Peruvian women
21st-century Peruvian politicians
21st-century Peruvian women politicians